The 1981 FIBA European Championship, commonly called FIBA EuroBasket 1981, was the 22nd FIBA EuroBasket regional basketball championship, held by FIBA Europe. The competition was hosted by Czechoslovakia and took place from 26 May to 5 June 1981.

Venues

Participants
Twelve national teams took part in the competition, divided in 2 six-teams groups.

First stage
The winner of each match earns two points, the loser one. The first three teams advance to the final stage, the last three team take part in the classification round.

Group A – Bratislava 

|}

Group B – Havířov 

|}

Places 7–12

|}

Places 1–6 in Prague

|}

Finals

Finals

Final standings

Awards

Team rosters
1. Soviet Union: Valdis Valters, Anatoly Myshkin, Vladimir Tkachenko, Sergejus Jovaiša, Alexander Belostenny, Stanislav Yeryomin, Sergei Tarakanov, Andrey Lopatov, Nikolay Deryugin, Aleksandr Salnikov, Gennadi Kapustin, Nikolai Fesenko (Coach: Alexander Gomelsky)

2. Yugoslavia: Krešimir Ćosić, Dražen Dalipagić, Mirza Delibašić, Dragan Kićanović, Andro Knego, Peter Vilfan, Predrag Benaček, Ratko Radovanović, Boban Petrović, Branko Skroče, Željko Poljak, Petar Popović (Coach: Bogdan Tanjević)

3. Czechoslovakia: Kamil Brabenec, Stanislav Kropilák, Zdenek Kos, Vlastimil Klimes, Vojtech Petr, Vlastimil Havlik, Jaroslav Skala, Juraj Zuffa, Peter Rajniak, Zdenek Bohm, Justin Sedlak, Gustav Hraska (Coach: Pavel Petera)

4. Spain: Juan Antonio Corbalán, Juan Antonio San Epifanio, Wayne Brabender, Fernando Martín, Candido "Chicho" Sibilio, Manuel Flores, Ignacio "Nacho" Solozábal, Rafael Rullán, Juan Domingo de la Cruz, Quim Costa, Josep Maria Margall, Fernando Romay (Coach: Antonio Díaz-Miguel)

References

1981
Euro
1981 in Czechoslovak sport
International basketball competitions hosted by Czechoslovakia
Sport in Havířov
Sports competitions in Prague
Sports competitions in Bratislava
1980s in Prague
1980s in Bratislava
May 1981 sports events in Europe
June 1981 sports events in Europe